Joy is the second EP by American hardcore punk band Minutemen. Recorded not long after the release of their first EP Paranoid Time, it is also the first release on Minutemen's own label New Alliance Records. Their first studio album The Punch Line was released three months after Joy, but Joy was recorded after The Punch Line.

The EP also appears as part of the My First Bells cassette and the Post-Mersh Vol. 3 CD, both on SST Records. SST reissued the EP in 1987 not long after buying New Alliance Records from Mike Watt. When SST took over the New Alliance label and back catalogue, the label redated the copyright on the EP to be 1987, causing some fans to believe that the EP contained previously unreleased material. The EP was also reissued as a 10" colored vinyl EP and in 1988 as a three-inch CD. Joy was recorded and mixed in five hours.

Track listing

Personnel
Minutemen
D. Boon – guitar, vocals
Mike Watt – bass
George Hurley – drums

Production
Mike Patton – record producer
Jon St. James – recording engineer
Tom Trapp – recording engineer

References

Minutemen (band) albums
1981 EPs
New Alliance Records EPs
SST Records EPs